Umm el-Marra,, east of modern Aleppo in the Jabbul Plain of northern Syria, was one of the ancient Near East's oldest cities, located on a crossroads of two trade routes northwest of Ebla, in a landscape that was much more fertile than it is today. Possibly this is the city of Tuba mentioned in Egyptian inscriptions listing cities that were defeated or destroyed in the Pharaoh Thutmose III's north Syrian campaign. The city of Tuba is also mentioned
in epigraphic remains from Ebla, Mari, and Alalakh.

History

Early Bronze 
Umm el-Marra probably had three to five thousand inhabitants between 2800 BCE and about 2100/2000 BCE, when Tuba and other cities in the Jabbul Plain experienced a mysterious collapse of central authority that lasted about 200 years. Partial answers to the question, why these early centers were so brittle, may lie in the effects of sustained drought on overstressed primitive agriculture. Dr Glenn Schwartz of Johns Hopkins, who has been doing field archaeology at Umm el-Marra, suggested in 1994 that "they placed extensive demands on their environments, continually intensifying their agriculture to feed more people. The added stress from a few dry years may have been the straw that broke the camel's back."

Middle Bronze 
Simple daily life went on in Tuba, for the site was never completely abandoned, but at the renaissance of the city in 1800 BCE, Amoritic names were now in control. Tuba went on to enjoy a second   period of prosperity and power, as a "subsidiary capital" of the still shadowy kingdom of Yamkhad.

Late Bronze 
The site was destroyed in the 14th century BC and completely abandoned by 1200 BC. After a long period of abandonment, the site was re-occupied in the Hellenistic and Roman periods.

Archaeology
The site covers around 25 hectares. It was surrounded with a city wall
with 3 gates and a defensive ditch.
Excavation of Umm el-Marra began in the late 1970s and early 1980s with
soundings by a Belgian team led by Roland Tefnin.
From 1994 until 2010, a joint archaeological team from the Johns Hopkins University and
the University of Amsterdam worked at Umm el-Marra.

A rare intact, unlooted tomb, ca. 2300 BCE, uncovered by Dr. Schwartz's team in 2000 at the site, made science press headlines, for it contained five richly-adorned adults and three babies, some of whom were ornamented head-to-toe in gold and silver.

It may be the oldest intact possibly royal tomb yet to be found in Syria. Dr. Schwartz noted of peculiar aspects in the burial that they 'may hint at ritual characteristics, rather than a tomb simply reserved for royalty or elite individuals.' The interment, which was above ground in ancient times, included three layers of skeletons in wooden coffins lined with textiles. The top layer includes traces of two coffins, each containing a young woman in her twenties and a baby. The women were the most richly ornamented of all the occupants of the tomb, with jewelry of silver, gold and lapis lazuli. Also of interest on this level was an accompanying lump of iron, possibly from a meteorite. Geochemical analysis of the iron, based on the ratio of iron to nickel and cobalt, confirms that the iron was meteoritic in origin. One of the babies appeared to be wearing a bronze torque, or collar.

In the layer below were coffins of two adult males and the remains of a baby at some distance from both men, close to the entrance of the tomb. This differs from the placement of the babies in the upper layer, where they were placed next to the women's bodies. Crowning the older man was a silver diadem decorated with a disk bearing a rosette motif, while the man opposite had a bronze dagger. The third and lowest layer held an adult male with a silver cup and silver pins.

All the individuals were accompanied by scores of ceramic vessels, some of which contained animal bones that may have been part of funerary animal offerings. Outside the tomb to the south, against the tomb wall, was a jar containing the remains of a baby, a spouted jar, and two skulls, horselike but apparently belonging neither to horses or donkeys. These equids were subsequently identified as kunga, a hybrid of domestic donkey and wild ass.

Incisions on four clay cylinders have been hypothesized to be Early Alphabetic Semitic writing, which would make them the oldest such examples.

The ceramics in the tomb date to around 2300 B.C., the latter part of Egypt's pyramid age.

Modern village

As of 2004, Umm el-Marra has 1,878 population.

See also
Cities of the ancient Near East

Notes

References
Jerrold Cooper et al., A Mittani-Era Tablet from Umm el-Marra, 2005
Schwartz, Glenn M, Memory and its Demolition: Ancestors, Animals and Sacrifice at Umm el-Marra, Syria Cambridge Archaeological Journal, vol. 23/3, pp. 495–522, 2013

External links
Johns Hopkins news release, May 9, 1994.
Johns Hopkins expedition report
N.Y. Times October 3, 2000 report of the unlooted burial at Tuba.

Bronze Age sites in Syria
Former populated places in Syria
Archaeological sites in Aleppo Governorate